Kelly Dianne Brown (born 8 July 1973) is a New Zealand former cricketer who played as a right-arm medium bowler and right-handed batter. She appeared in 3 Test matches and 14 One Day Internationals for New Zealand between 1996 and 1997. Her final WODI appearance was in the final of the 1997 Women's Cricket World Cup. She played domestic cricket for Auckland

References

External links

1973 births
Living people
New Zealand women cricketers
New Zealand women Test cricketers
New Zealand women One Day International cricketers
Cricketers from Hamilton, New Zealand
Auckland Hearts cricketers